The 2012 World Pool Masters, also known as World Pool Masters XX, was a nine-ball pool tournament that took place in Kielce, Poland between 5–7 October 2012. It was the 20nd edition of the invitational tournament organised by Matchroom Sport. Poland's Karol Skowerski won the event, defeating Mateusz Śniegocki in the final 8–6.

Defending champion Ralf Souquet lost his first round match to eventual runner-up Mateusz Śniegocki.

Event prize money

Tournament bracket

References

External links

2014
World Pool Masters
World Pool Masters
World Pool Masters
Sport in Kielce
World Pool Masters